Abel Ávila Rodríguez (born 15 March 1977) is a Paralympic athlete from Spain competing mainly in category T12 middle-distance events.

Athletics 
Competing at the Greece hosted 2005 European Championships, he won a medal.  He medaled at the 2006 World Championships. Competing at the 2009 IBSA European Championships, he won a medal. Prior to the start of the London Games, he trained with several other visually impaired Spanish track and field athletes in Logroño. From the Catalan region of Spain, he was a recipient a Plan ADO scholarship.

Paralympics 
Abel has competed in three summer Paralympics, his first in 2000 proving to be his most successful winning a silver in his only event the 800m.  In the two following games he competed in 800m and 1500m and in 2004 the 5000m all without any medal success.

Notes

References

External links 
 
 
 Abel Ávila récord del mundo de 10.000 metros at RunScore.net

1977 births
Living people
Spanish male middle-distance runners
Spanish disability athletes
Paralympic athletes of Spain
Paralympic silver medalists for Spain
Paralympic athletes with a vision impairment
Athletes (track and field) at the 2000 Summer Paralympics
Athletes (track and field) at the 2004 Summer Paralympics
Athletes (track and field) at the 2008 Summer Paralympics
Athletes (track and field) at the 2012 Summer Paralympics
Medalists at the 2000 Summer Paralympics
Plan ADOP alumni
Paralympic medalists in athletics (track and field)
Visually impaired middle-distance runners
Paralympic middle-distance runners
Spanish blind people